Rhynchosaurs are a group of extinct herbivorous Triassic archosauromorph reptiles, belonging to the order Rhynchosauria. Members of the group are distinguished by their triangular skulls and elongated, beak like premaxillary bones. Rhynchosaurs first appeared in the Middle Triassic or possibly the Early Triassic, before becoming abundant and globally distributed during the Carnian stage of the Late Triassic.

Description 

Rhynchosaurs were herbivores, and at times abundant (in some fossil localities accounting for 40 to 60% of specimens found), with stocky bodies and a powerful beak. Early primitive forms, like Mesosuchus and Howesia, were generally small and more typically lizard-like in build, and had skulls rather similar to the early diapsid Youngina, except for the beak and a few other features. Later and more advanced genera grew to medium to medium large size, up to two meters in length. The skull in these forms were short, broad, and triangular, becoming much wider than long in the most advanced forms like Hyperodapedon (= Scaphonyx), with a deep cheek region, and the premaxilla extending outwards and downwards to form the upper beak. The broad skull would have accommodated powerful jaw muscles. The lower jaw was also deep, and when the mouth was closed it clamped firmly into the maxilla (upper jaw), like the blade of a penknife closing into its handle. This scissors-like action would have enabled rhynchosaurs to cut up tough plant material.

The teeth were unusual; those in the maxilla and palate were modified into broad tooth plates. The hind feet were equipped with massive claws, presumably for digging up roots and tubers by backwards scratching of the hind limbs.

Like many animals of this time, they had a worldwide distribution, being found across Pangea. These abundant animals might have died out suddenly at the end of the Carnian (Middle of the Late Triassic period), perhaps as a result of the extinction of the Dicroidium flora on which they may have fed. On the other hand, Spielmann, Lucas and Hunt (2013) described three distal ends of humeri from early-mid Norian Bull Canyon Formation in New Mexico, which they interpreted as bones of rhynchosaurs belonging to the species Otischalkia elderae; thus, the fossils might indicate that rhynchosaurs survived until the Norian.

Classification

Taxonomy

Phylogeny

The Rhynchosauria included a single family, named Rhynchosauridae. All rhynchosaurs, apart from the four Early and Middle Triassic monospecific genera, Eohyosaurus, Mesosuchus, Howesia and Noteosuchus, are included in this family. Hyperodapedontidae named by Lydekker (1885) was considered its junior synonym. However, Langer et al. (2000) noted that Hyperodapedontidae was erected by Lydekker to include Hyperodapedon gordoni and H. huxleyi, clearly excluding Rhynchosaurus articeps, which was the only other rhynchosaur known at that time. Thus, they defined it as the stem-based taxon that includes all rhynchosaurs more closely related to Hyperodapedon than to Rhynchosaurus.

Within Hyperodapedontidae, which is now a subgroup of Rhynchosauridae, two subfamilies have been named. Stenaulorhynchinae named by Kuhn (1933) is defined sensu Langer and Schultz (2000) to include all species more closely related to Stenaulorhynchus than to Hyperodapedon. Hyperodapedontinae named by Chatterjee (1969) was redefined by Langer et al. (2000) to include "all rhynchosaurs closer to Hyperodapedon than to "Rhynchosaurus" spenceri" (now Fodonyx).

The cladogram below is based on Schultz et al. (2016) which is the most genera inclusive rhynchosaur phylogenetic analysis to date, with the position of Noteosuchus taken from other recent analyses (since it was removed in Schultz et al. (2016)), all in consensus with one another.

References

Bibliography 
 Benton, M. J. (2000), Vertebrate Paleontology, 2nd ed. Blackwell Science Ltd.
 Carroll, R. L. (1988), Vertebrate Paleontology and Evolution, W.H. Freeman & Co.
 Dilkes, D. W. 1998. The Early Triassic rhynchosaur Mesosuchus browni and the interrelationships of basal archosauromorph reptiles. Philosophical Transactions of the Royal Society of London: Biological Sciences, 353:501-541.

External links 
 Dinosaurs of Rio Grande do Sul, Brasil.

 
Triassic reptiles
Triassic taxonomic orders
Anisian life
Carnian life
Norian life
Olenekian life
Early Triassic reptiles
Middle Triassic reptiles
Late Triassic reptiles
Olenekian first appearances
Norian extinctions